Dipoena santacatarinae is a species of araneomorphae spider in the family Theridiidae.

Description
The male holotype measures  and the female paratype .

Etymology
The name of the species comes from the place of its discovery, Santa Catarina.

Distribution
The species is endemic to Brazil. It is found in the states of Rio Grande do Sul, Santa Catarina, Paraná, São Paulo, Rio de Janeiro and Minas Gerais.

References

External links

Theridiidae
Spiders of Brazil
Spiders described in 1963